Partula dentifera is a species of air-breathing tropical land snail, a terrestrial pulmonate gastropod mollusk in the family Partulidae. This species was endemic to French Polynesia. It is now extinct in the wild.

References

External links

Partula (gastropod)
Gastropods described in 1852
Taxonomy articles created by Polbot